Paisley railway station may refer to the closed Paisley railway station in Melbourne, or one of several railway stations in the town of Paisley, Renfrewshire, Scotland:

Stations with Paisley in the name 
 Paisley Abercorn railway station (closed)
 Paisley Canal railway station
 Paisley East railway station (closed)
 Paisley Gilmour Street railway station
 Paisley Hamilton Street railway station (closed)
 Paisley St James railway station
 Paisley West railway station (closed)

Other stations in Paisley 
 Dykebar railway station (closed) 
 Ferguslie railway station (closed)
 Glenfield railway station (closed) 
 Hawkhead railway station
 Potterhill railway station (closed)
 Stanely railway station (closed)

Railway stations in Renfrewshire
Transport in Paisley, Renfrewshire